was a Japanese businessman, central banker and the 13th Governor of the Bank of Japan (BOJ).

Early life
Fukai was born in Gumma Prefecture.

Career
Fukai was the aide to Takahashi Korekiyo, who was responsible for  negotiating war loans to pay for Japan's participation in the Russo-Japanese War.

Fukui was part of the Japanese delegation at the Versailles Peace Conference in 1919.  He was a special appointee of the Foreign Office at the Washington Conference on Limitation of Armament in 1921.  Fukui was also a Japanese delegate at the London Economic Conference in 1933.

Fukai was Governor of the Bank of Japan from June 4, 1935 – February 9, 1937.  His promotion came after seven years as Deputy Governor.

During his term as head of the bank, his chief concern was ensuring confidence in Japan's currency and limiting monetary inflation.  Ineffective efforts to slow the growth of military spending marked Fukai's term as BOJ governor.

Notes

References
 Hardacre, Helen and Adam L. Kern, eds. (1997). New Directions in the Study of Meiji Japan. Leiden: Brill. ; 
 Kirshner, Jonathan. (2007). Appeasing Bankers: Financial Caution on the Road to War. Princeton: Princeton University Press. ; 

1871 births
1945 deaths
Governors of the Bank of Japan
Japanese bankers
People from Gunma Prefecture